Patrick Connolly Bergin (born 4 February 1951) is an Irish actor and singer perhaps best known for his leading role opposite Julia Roberts in Sleeping with the Enemy (1991), the  title character in Robin Hood, terrorist Kevin O'Donnell in Patriot Games and for playing the villainous Aidan Maguire in the BBC soap EastEnders in 2017–2018.

Early life
Bergin was born in Dublin. His father, Patrick Bergin snr., was a Labour Party politician who once studied to be a priest with the Holy Ghost Fathers in Blackrock, Ireland. Patrick was one of four sons and one daughter (Pearse, Emmet, Patrick, Allen and Siobhan Bergin). He left Dublin for London in 1973, and by the time he was 17 he was in London running a theatre company. He worked on building sites and at a library. He studied at night and completed an education degree from North London Polytechnic. He was an English teacher for several years, then formed his own theatrical company because "no one else would have him".

Career
In 1980, Bergin decided to pursue acting full-time and found work in repertory theatre. For much of the 1990s it seemed that no one in Hollywood was interested in him. He accepted diverse acting roles, including a trilogy of Yeats plays; Morphine and Dolly Mixtures, for which he won a  BAFTA Cymru Award for Best Actor; Durango, based on John B Keane's novel; hosting TnaG's Silín Draíochta; and narrating Patrick Cassidy's Famine Concert. After Sleeping with the Enemy (1991), he portrayed the title character in Robin Hood, opposite Uma Thurman as Maid Marian. He describes 1996 as the lowest point in his career, a time when he rarely received any calls for movie roles.

Internationally, Bergin's best-known role may be that of the menacing husband of Julia Roberts' character in the thriller Sleeping with the Enemy. He is also known for his role as Irish terrorist Kevin O'Donnell in the film adaptation of Tom Clancy's Patriot Games. He also appeared as Robin Hood in a 1991 film. In 2013 he appeared in the Scottish film The Wee Man playing notorious Glasgow gangster Arthur 'The Godfather' Thompson. He joined the BBC soap EastEnders towards the end of 2017, departing in March 2018.

Music
Bergin leads the band Patrick Bergin and the Spirit Merchants. They had a top 10 hit in Ireland with their song "The Knacker", released in 2003, which tells the story of a person who recycles horse carcasses and turns them into glue. As a singer, Bergin collaborated with Vlad DeBriansky and appeared on his album Jacks Last Dollar.
He also appeared in the video of DJ Steve Mac's song "Paddy's Revenge".

Bergin was onstage singing the Leonard Cohen song "Anthem" as Pope Francis, on his visit to Ireland, arrived in Croke Park for the Festival of Families as part of the World Meeting of Families 2018.

Charity work
In 1993, Bergin bought an old church in Tipperary and converted it into a poetry centre. He explained: "I've recently come to feel I can encourage children and teenagers with their writing. I'm continually giving groups money to make videos, but I insist that they have a good script. I do it because it makes the difference between them doing a video or not. It doesn't cost a lot, and it gives kids an incredible boost of confidence." In 1998, in response to the murder of a 14-year-old Tallaght boy, Ben Smyth, Bergin helped to establish a special fund to sponsor young children from Tallaght.

Personal life
At a wedding in the early 1980s, Bergin met his future wife, Paula Frazier, a British woman of Afro-Caribbean descent. They married in Trinidad and Tobago in 1992. They have a daughter, Tatiana (Tia). After their divorce, Bergin began dating Helen Goldin.

Filmography

 Taffin (1988) as Mo Taffin
 Act of Betrayal (1988) as Michael McGurk
 The Courier (1988) as Christy
 Mountains of the Moon (1990) as Richard Francis Burton
 Sleeping with the Enemy (1991) as Martin Burney
 Robin Hood (1991) as Robin Hood
 Highway to Hell (1991) as Beezle
 Love Crimes  (1992) as David Hanover 
 Patriot Games (1992) as Kevin O'Donnell
 Frankenstein (1992) as Victor Frankenstein
 The Hummingbird Tree (1992) as Stephen Holmes
 Map of the Human Heart (1993) as Walter Russell
 They (1993) as Mark Samuels
 Lawnmower Man 2: Beyond Cyberspace (1996) as Benjamin Trace
 The Ripper (1997) as Inspector Jim Hansen
 Stolen Women: Captured Hearts (1997) TV Movie as Daniel Morgan
 The Island on Bird Street (1997) as Stefan
 The Lost World (1998) as George Challenger
 Eye of the Beholder (1999) as Alexander Leonard
 Durango (1999) as Fergus Mullaney
 Treasure Island (1999) as Billy Bones
 Promise Her Anything (1999) as Vernon Fry
 When the Sky Falls (2000) as Mackey
 St. Patrick: The Irish Legend (2000) as Patrick
 Merlin: The Return (2000) as King Arthur
 Cause of Death (2001) as Taylor Lewis 
 Amazons and Gladiators (2001) as Crassius
 Devil's Prey (2001) as Minister Seth
 Jewel (2001) as Leston Hilbur
 Beneath Loch Ness (2001) as Blay
 High Explosive (2001) as Jack Randall
 Dracula (2002) as Dracula
  King of Texas (2002) as Mr Highsmith
 Bloom (2003) as the Citizen
 The Boys from County Clare (2003) as Padjo
 Ella Enchanted (2004) as Sir Peter
 Icon (2005) as Igor Komarov
 Johnny Was (2006) as Flynn
 Played (2006) as Riley
 Secret of the Cave (2006) as Patrick Wallace
 Ghostwood (2007) as Friar Paul
 Hustle (2009) as Toby Baxter
 Eva (2010) as Oswald
 Perfect Day (2011) as Rick's Father
 Absolute Fear (2012) as Captain Morrow
 Gallowwalkers (2012) as Marshall Gaza
 Songs for Amy (2012) as Patrick Flynn
 Shark Week (2012) as Tiburon
  The Wee Man (2013) as Arthur Thompson
 Age of Kill (2015) as Sir Alistair Montcrief
 Free Fire (2016) as Howard Matheson (Howie)
 EastEnders (2017–2018) as Aidan Maguire – regular role, 32 episodes
 We Still Steal the Old Way  (2017) as George Briggs
 Cage (2018) as Peter Karl Bradley
 Red Rock (2018–2019) as Jim Tierney
 Wild Bill (2019) as Frank McGill 
 The South Westerlies  as Mike Kelleher (Big Mike)
 The Last Days of American Crime (2020) as Rossi Dumois
 Finding You (2020) as Seamus
 The Kindred (2021) as Father Monroe
 Cold Sun (2022) as Karl Quinn

Awards and nominations

References

External links

1951 births
20th-century Irish male actors
21st-century Irish male actors
Irish male film actors
Irish male television actors
Living people
Male actors from Dublin (city)
People from Cloughjordan
Teachers of English